A united front is an alliance of groups against their common enemies.

The United Front may also refer to:

Politics
 United Front (Afghanistan), the Northern Alliance, officially the United Islamic National Front for the Salvation of Afghanistan
 Anguilla United Front
 United Front (East Pakistan)
 United Front of Mozambique
 United Front (Sri Lanka)

India
 United Front (India)
 United Front (West Bengal), a political coalition in West Bengal
 United Front (1967–1969, Kerala), a political coalition in Kerala
 United Front (1970–1979, Kerala), a political coalition in Kerala

China
 United Front (China), a political strategy of the Chinese Communist Party involving networks of groups and individuals
 United Front Work Department, a Chinese Communist Party department for relations with non-communist entities
 United Front in Taiwan, a strategy used by China to achieve dominance over Taiwan
 First United Front (1924–27), an alliance between the nationalists and communists of China to end the Warlord Era
 Second United Front (1937–41), an alliance between the nationalists and communists of China against Japanese forces during the Second Sino-Japanese War

Other uses
 "Einheitsfrontlied" (German for "United Front Song"), an anti-fascist song written to unite social democrats and communists against the Nazi party
 United Front: Brass Ecstasy at Newport, a 2011 album by Dave Douglas

See also
 United Democratic Front (disambiguation)
 Popular front, any coalition of working-class and middle-class parties
 National Front (disambiguation)
 United Front Games, a former Canadian video game development studio